Reid Cashman (born March 14, 1983) is an American former professional ice hockey defenseman, who currently serves as the head coach for the Dartmouth Big Green of the NCAA.

Cashman attended Quinnipiac University, where he was a standout defenseman for the Quinnipiac Bobcats men's ice hockey team, recording 23 goals and 125 assists for 148 points in 151 career games with the Bobcats. Upon graduation, Cashman was signed by the Toronto Maple Leafs of the National Hockey League, and was assigned to play with their American Hockey League (AHL) affiliate, the Toronto Marlies. During his AHL career, Cashman also skated with the Wilkes-Barre/Scranton Penguins and Milwaukee Admirals. In the ECHL Cashman suited up with the Wheeling Nailers, Columbia Inferno, and Cincinnati Cyclones, before heading to Austria to complete his playing career with the EHC Black Wings Linz.

Head coaching record

Awards and honors

References

External links

1983 births
Living people
American ice hockey coaches
American men's ice hockey defensemen
Cincinnati Cyclones (ECHL) players
Colgate Raiders men's ice hockey players
Columbia Inferno players
Dartmouth Big Green men's ice hockey coaches
EHC Black Wings Linz players
Milwaukee Admirals players
Quinnipiac Bobcats men's ice hockey players
Toronto Marlies players
Wheeling Nailers players
Wilkes-Barre/Scranton Penguins players
Waterloo Black Hawks players
AHCA Division I men's ice hockey All-Americans